Tudor Țopa (born 13 October 1932) is a Moldovan publicist.

Biography 

He served as member of the Parliament of Moldova.

External links 
 Cine au fost şi ce fac deputaţii primului Parlament din R. Moldova (1990-1994)?
 Declaraţia deputaţilor din primul Parlament

Bibliography 
 Petru Soltan. Colectiv de autori.  Calendarul Național-2002, Ed. BNRM, Chișinău, 2002, 277-279
 Andrei Calcea. Personalități orheiene. Chișinău, Ed. Pontos, 2003
 Literatura și Arta Moldovei. Enciclopedie, vol.2

References

1932 births
Living people
People from Telenești District
Moldova State University alumni
Moldovan journalists
Male journalists
Moldovan MPs 1990–1994
Popular Front of Moldova MPs

Recipients of the Order of Honour (Moldova)